The Truth Is Here is the second EP by Brother Ali. It was released on March 9, 2009, by Rhymesayers Entertainment. The EP contains nine songs which were previously unreleased. The song "Good Lord" had a promotional video. The CD was also sold with a DVD filled with interviews, music videos, and a full-length live performance from his The Undisputed Truth tour.

Reception

The EP was acclaimed by critics and gained 86% based on six reviews.

 The Phoenix (4/4) - "The Truth Is Here is his second perfect disc in that many years and just earned a spot in my Top Five Alive column."
 Pitchfork (7.4/10) - "No one aspect of Ali's personality really dominates. The Truth Is Here is all the stronger for it, and that can only be considered a good sign."

Sales
The CD debuted at  number 119 on the Billboard 200 and sold 4,861 units in its first week out.

Track list
 "Real as Can Be" – 2:23 
 "Philistine David" – 3:30
 "Little Rodney" – 4:27
 "Palm the Joker" – 2:33
 "Good Lord" – 4:11
 "Baby Don't Go" – 4:01
 "Talkin' My Shit" – 4:55
 "The Believers"  (featuring Slug) – 4:47
 "Begin Here" – 3:22

Personnel
Engineer – Joe "Mabbs" Mabbott
Executive Producer – A. Davis, A. Newman, B. Sayers
Mastered By – Chris Gerhinger
Mixed By – Joe "Mabbs" Mabbott
Producer – Ant
Scratches – Ant

Album chart positions

References

External links
The Truth Is Here at Discogs
Rhymesayers.com

Brother Ali albums
2009 EPs
Rhymesayers Entertainment EPs